Le Métailler is a mountain of the Pennine Alps, overlooking the lake of Cleuson in the canton of Valais.

References

External links
 Le Métailler on Hikr

Mountains of the Alps
Alpine three-thousanders
Mountains of Switzerland
Mountains of Valais